Ceratochaetops is a genus of flies in the family Tachinidae.

Species
C. delphinensis (Villeneuve, 1931)
C. triseta (Villeneuve, 1922)

References

Tachinidae genera
Exoristinae